The 1997 season of the Ukrainian Championship was the 6th season of Ukraine's women's football competitions. The championship ran from 2 May 1997 to 8 October 1997.

The championship was played as quadruple round-robin compered to last year double round-robin as number of participants decreased.

Teams

Team changes

Name changes
 Hrafit Zaporizhia, last season was known as Iskra Zaporizhia
 Donchanka-Varna Donetsk, last season was known as Varna Donetsk
 Lehenda-Cheksil Chernihiv, last season was known as Lehenda Chernihiv
 Stal-Nika-MMK Makiivka, last season was known as Stal Makiivka

Higher League

League table

References

External links
WFPL.ua
Women's Football.ua

1997
1997–98 in Ukrainian association football leagues
1996–97 in Ukrainian association football leagues
Ukrainian Women's League
Ukrainian Women's League